Engelbert I may refer to:
 Engelbert I, Count of Berg (d. 1189)
 Engelbert I, Count of the Mark (d. 1277) 
 Engelbert I of Nassau ( 1370–1380 – 1442)
 Engelbert I, Margrave of Istria (d. 1096)